Destierros is a 2017 Canadian documentary film, directed by Hubert Caron-Guay The film centres on migrants from Central America who are desperate to emigrate to the United States or Canada for a better life, amid the context of Donald Trump's attempts to close the US-Mexican border.

The film premiered at the 2017 Visions du Réel in Nyon, Switzerland. It received four Prix Iris nominations at the 20th Quebec Cinema Awards, for Best Documentary Film, Best Cinematography in a Documentary (Étienne Roussy), Best sound in a Documentary (Alexis Pilon-Gladu and Samuel Gagnon-Thibodeau) and Best Editing in a Documentary (Ariane Pétel-Despots).

Destierros was released in theatres on 19 January 2018.

References

External links
 

2017 films
2017 documentary films
Canadian documentary films
Documentary films about illegal immigration to the United States
Spanish-language Canadian films
2010s Canadian films